The Morning in a Pine Forest is a painting by Russian artists Ivan Shishkin and Konstantin Savitsky. The bears were painted by Savitsky, but the art collector Pavel Tretyakov effaced his signature, stating that "from idea until performance, everything discloses the painting manner and creative method peculiar just to Shishkin", so the painting is now sometimes credited solely to Shishkin.

The Morning in a Pine Forest became very popular, being reproduced on various items, including the "Clumsy Bear" chocolates by Krasny Oktyabr. According to one poll, the painting is the second most popular in Russia behind Bogatyrs by Viktor Vasnetsov. Shishkin's similar paintings are the Forest in Spring (1884) and The Sestroretsk Forest (1896).

It is believed that Shishkin painted the pine trees near Gorodomlya Island which located on Lake Seliger.

Notes

Bears in art
Landscape paintings
Russian paintings
1889 paintings
Collections of the Tretyakov Gallery